Christian Mejía is a Puerto Rican goalie.
He plays for University of Albany.

References

1989 births
Living people
Puerto Rican footballers
Puerto Rico international footballers
Albany Great Danes men's soccer players
American sportspeople of Puerto Rican descent
Sportspeople from Queens, New York
Soccer players from New York City
Association football goalkeepers